SSSS.Dynazenon is a 2021 anime television series produced by Studio Trigger. It features the same universe with SSSS.Gridman, as well as the same staff from the series, including director Amemiya, writer Hasegawa, character designer Sakamoto and composer Sagisu. The opening theme is "Imperfect" by Masayoshi Ōishi, while the ending theme is "Strobe Memory" by Maaya Uchida. The series aired from April 2 to June 18, 2021, on Tokyo MX, BS11, and MBS.



Episode list

References

SSSS.Dynazenon